The 2019–20 season was Al-Ahli's 44th consecutive season in the top flight of Saudi football and 83rd year in existence as a football club. The club participated in the Pro League, the King Cup and both the 2019 and the 2020 editions of the AFC Champions League.

The season covered the period from 1 July 2019 to 30 September 2020.

Players

Squad information

Out on loan

Transfers and loans

Transfers in

Loans in

Transfers out

Loans out

Pre-season

Competitions

Overall

Overview

Goalscorers

Last Updated: 26 September 2020

Assists

Last Updated: 17 September 2020

Clean sheets

Last Updated: 14 September 2020

References

Al-Ahli Saudi FC seasons
Ahli